Allan Wexler  (born 1949) is an American interdisciplinary artist and educator. A practising artist since the early 1970s, Wexler works with sculpture, photography and photo-based drawings that poetically and often humorously explore the natural world, our senses and how our environment affects daily rituals.

Early life and education 
Wexler was born in Bridgeport, Connecticut in 1949. He received a Bachelor of Fine Arts in 1971 and a Bachelor of Architecture in 1972, both from the Rhode Island School of Design. He holds a Master of Architecture degree from the Pratt Institute.

Wexler entered the Rhode Island School of Design to study architecture. "In the late 1960's he was an early member of the group of architects and artists who questioned the perceived divide between art and the design disciplines. They called themselves visionary architects or paper architects".  Wexler moved to New York City in 1973.

Career 
After school he set up a studio in New York City. His work continued to question the perceived divide between fine art and the applied arts and between function and poetry. His studio practice includes a wide range of media and activities including sculpture, installations, museum interventions, painting, drawing, writing, and design. 

Ritual, ceremony, and memory became the content of his experimental work. New influences seeped in - Japanese Tea ceremony, The Primitive Hut, Duchamp, Warhol and Beuys, John Cage and the Poetics of Space. He found the practical needs of clients and the scale of architecture to be a distraction and so he shifted from the practice of architecture to studying the poetics of buildings, rooms, and utensils.

Wexler's work is exhibited both in the United States and internationally. Included among his recent exhibitions and public works are SACRA Buffalo, New York 2019, Parrish Art Museum, Water Mill, NY 2019, the Wheaton Art Center, Millville, Emanations 2019, the Mattress Factory, Pittsburgh, PA, 2017

Wexler has taught fine art, design, and architecture for over 40 years, currently on the faculty of Parsons School of Design in New York City. He has taught, and lectured internationally for most of his career including at Pratt Institute, New Jersey Institute of Technology, Rhode Island School of Design, Bauhaus School of Architecture, Design Academy Eindhoven, Cooper Union School of Fine Arts, Brown University.

Wexler has worked collaboratively with his partner and wife Ellen Wexler; a 2006 sculpture by the pair is installed at the Hudson River Park in New York City.

Public art and commissions 

 Cleveland Public Art Project, Wind Works, Shadow and Light. 200
 Public Artwork, NYC, Hudson River Park Trust, Two Too Large Tables 2006
 Contemporary Arts Center, Cincinnati, OH installation, Hyper Room 2003 
 Arts for Transit, MTA New York, public art Overlook 2001 
 Expo 2000, Hanover, Germany, public art In the Shadow of the Wind.
 New York City Board of Education, Cultural Affairs. Three permanent installations in schools.1999
 University of Massachusetts, Home Rooms. Crate House 1991
 Living Space for Artist in Residence, Mattress Factory Gallery, Pittsburgh, PA 1988

Selected exhibitions 
 Venice Architecture Biennale How Will We Live Together, curated by Hakim Sarkis,  May – October 2021
 SACRA Buffalo, New York. Public art. Field Office: Young Builders Bookmobile
 Parrish Art Museum, Water Mill, NY, Artists Choose Artists
 Ronald Feldman Gallery, New York, NY, Summer 2019.
 Wheaton Art Center, Millville, Emanations, Exhibition of Body Works in Glass

Collections
Jewish Museum, New York

Awards 
Guggenheim Fellowship (2016)
Rome Prize Fellowship (2005) 
Graham Foundation Award (2016)
Chrysler Award for Innovation in Design (1997)
Henry J. Leir Prize, Reinventing Ritual, Jewish Museum, New York. (2009)

Books and catalogs 
Allan Wexler - Absurd Thinking: Between Art and Design, 2017 Lars Müller Publishers
Allan Wexler: Structures for Reflection. Karl Ernst Osthaus Museum, Germany1993

Interviews 

Review of Allan Wexler's work at Venice Architecture Biennale by American art critic Aaron Betsky (2021)  

Celebrating the power of transformation at Venice Architecture Biennale 2021  

Creating Problems: A Conversation with Allan Wexler (2021)  

Allan Wexler: Artist Spotlight (2021)

Wheaton Conversations: Artists Allan Wexler & Virgil Marti (2020)

Art Critical - The Andy Warhol of Architecture: Allan Wexler talks about his art and thinking (2017)

Hyperallergic - Allan Wexler - A Radical Deconstructor of Habitation 

Allan Wexler, architecture and nature by Michele Calzavara (2016)

Irony and the Power of Artistic Production, Michael Fehr (2001)

Furnishing the Primitive Hut: Allan Wexler's Experiments beyond buildings by Aaron Betsky

References 

1949 births
20th-century American architects
21st-century American architects
Living people
Rhode Island School of Design alumni
Pratt Institute alumni